Transport Nagar is an elevated Red Line Lucknow Metro station in Lucknow, Uttar Pradesh, India.

History
Construction start at Transport Nagar metro station in the year 2014.

Station layout

Connections

Entry/Exit

See also

References

External links

 website
 UrbanRail.Net – descriptions of all metro systems in the world, each with a schematic map showing all stations.

Lucknow Metro stations
Railway stations in India opened in 2017